Emden is a city in Lower Saxony.

Emden may also refer to:

Places
 Emden, a town and seaport Lower Saxony, Germany
 Emden, Saxony-Anhalt, a municipality in Saxony-Anhalt, Germany
 Emden, Illinois, U.S.
 Emden, Missouri, U.S.

Ships
 SMS Emden (1908), a light cruiser in the German navy
 How We Beat the Emden, a 1915 Australian silent film about battle with the ship
 Our Emden, a 1926 silent film about the ship
 The Exploits of the Emden, a 1928 Australian silent film with footage from Our Emden
 Cruiser Emden, a 1932 film about the ship and remake of Our Emden
 Die Männer der Emden, a 2012 film about the ship's crew
 SMS Emden (1916), a light cruiser in the German navy
 German cruiser Emden
 German frigate Emden (F221), a Köln-class frigate of the German Navy
 German frigate Emden (F210), a Bremen-class frigate of the German Navy
 German corvette Emden (F266), a Braunschweig-class corvette of the German Navy

Other uses
 Emden (crater), a lunar crater
 Emden harbor, the harbor of Emden, Germany
 Emden Airport, an airport in Lower Saxony, Germany
 Kickers Emden, a German football club based in Emden
 Embden Goose or Emden, a breed of goose
 Emden Deep, the deepest part of the Philippine Trench, named after the German cruiser Emden

People with the surname
 Jacob Emden (1697–1776), rabbi and Talmud scholar
 Richard van Emden, British author and television producer
 Robert Emden (1862–1940), Swiss astrophysicist and meteorologist

See also
Embden (disambiguation)
 Lane-Emden equation, an equation in astrophysics
 List of ships named Emden
 D'Emden v Pedder, an Australian court case